Cap and Share is a regulatory and economic framework for controlling the use of fossil fuels in relation to climate stabilisation. Originally developed by Feasta (the Foundation for the Economics of Sustainability), the foundation believed that climate change is a global problem and that there is a need to cap and reduce greenhouse gas emissions globally, the philosophy of Cap and Share maintains that the earth’s atmosphere is a fundamental common resource. Consequently, it is argued, each individual should get an equal share of the benefits from the limited amount of fossil fuels that will have to be burned and their emissions released into the atmosphere in the period until the atmospheric concentration of greenhouse gases has been stabilised at a safe level. Given the vast discrepancies in fossil fuel use between the wealthy and poor on a global level, Cap and Share would have a highly progressive economic effect, reducing inequality and helping to support climate justice and the energy transition in the Global South.

Design 

This framework for phasing out fossil fuel production was originally devised by Feasta in 2005 and 2006. Cap and Share calls for fossil fuel production to be capped at its current level and then diminished year by year at a rate fast enough to prevent catastrophic climate change. 

Cap and Share has two main variants. In the variant which Feasta is currently promoting, fossil fuel companies would be obliged to buy a limited number of permits for their production (or imports, in a non-global system) each year, and the funds generated by the permit sales would then be shared out to the population on a per-capita basis. The sale of the permits could be done by auction. A floor price might be necessary to ensure that adequate funds would always be raised to ensure the functionality of the system. 

These cash transfers, if distributed per-capita, would be economically progressive because the wealthy - who tend to use more fossil fuels, proportionately - would be obliged to pay compensation to everyone else for this, while those who use fewer fossil fuels - who tend to be lower-income - would gain financially. 

Feasta has set out the case for the introduction of Cap and Share globally on the CapGlobalCarbon website. it has produced discussion papers on the logistics of rolling out such a system through a partnership between blocs of countries in the Global North and Global South. These include a 2020 proposal to transform the European ETS into a Cap and Share system, and a 2022 one to build out a Cap and Share system from the existing Beyond Oil and Gas Alliance.   

For Cap and Share to function effectively it would need to be accompanied by a suite of other policy measures. These are explored in Feasta's 2012 publication "Sharing for Survival: Restoring the Climate, the Commons and Society". The book includes a paper by the late economist Richard Douthwaite, entitled "Time for some optimism about the climate crisis".

In the second, older variant of Cap and Share, ('classic' Cap and Share), each year's allowance of emissions tonnage would be shared equally among the Earth's adult population, each of whom would receive a certificate representing their individual entitlement. The recipients would then sell their certificates through the banking system to oil, coal and gas producers who would need to acquire enough of them to cover the carbon dioxide emissions that would be emitted from all of the fossil fuel they sold. 

In 2008, Comhar, the National Sustainable Development Council of Ireland, commissioned a report on 'classic' Cap and Share which incorporates policy and economic analysis of using Cap and Share to control emissions in Ireland, particularly from the transport sector. The final report was published in December 2008.

Feasta members decided in 2012 to emphasise the first variant of Cap and Share (as described above) because of concerns that the 'classic' variant's method of distributing carbon quotas could prove to be too complex, and too easily gamed by entities which cannot be relied upon to act in the public interest. It would require individuals - who might not have much free time or enthusiasm available to deal with such matters - to seek out private banks which would then be assumed to be capable of behaving honestly while brokering deals with fossil fuel companies. This was considered to be an unrealistic approach. 

Cap and Share is partly an extension and popularisation of the Contraction and Convergence proposal developed by the Global Commons Institute, which also calls for an equal per capita distribution of emissions. Cap and Share differs in that it insists that emissions allocations should be distributed equally to individuals as their right, whereas Contraction and Convergence (C&C) allows governments to decide if this is the way they wish to share out what is, essentially, their national allocation. C&C also allows for (but does not insist on) a convergence period, during which the richer countries would receive higher per capita emissions allowances than poorer countries. 

'Classic' Cap and Share says people in rich countries should not be entitled to greater allocations than those in poor countries - all allocations should be equal - but it also suggests that in the early years of the system, a portion of everyone's emissions entitlement should be held back and distributed to governments of countries which were facing exceptional difficulties in adapting to climate change or to low levels of fossil energy use. The governments involved would sell their certificates to raise money for remedial works. For example, the government of Bangladesh might sell its allocation to pay for better defenses against rising sea levels.

Economic assessment 

If the future were known with certainty, then the economic implications of Cap and Share would equal the economic implications of a carbon tax with lump sum recycling—that is, the carbon tax revenue would be used to send every household a cheque in the post. Some argue that lump sum recycling is an inferior way to recycle the revenue of environmental taxes, and that this has been repeatedly confirmed for Ireland. The rationale is that with the carbon tax revenue coming into government coffers, it could be directly spent by the government rather than distributed to the population via cheques, and that other kinds of taxation, such as labour taxation, could be decreased correspondingly. It is argued that this would have a positive effect on GDP since there would be a greater incentive for firms to increase employment, and that it would also positively affect social equity, since labour taxes are regressive by nature.

The NGO that developed Cap and Share, Feasta, argues that while it is definitely a good idea to shift the tax burden away from labour and towards capital, a carbon tax is not the optimal instrument for this purpose. Carbon taxes do not establish a predictable level of emissions cuts, unlike a cap, and can be vulnerable to short-term political pressures such as an increase in the price of oil, since a country's tax policy is usually adjusted each year in the annual Budget.  Feasta suggests that if a carbon tax were to be introduced, it would work best in tandem with Cap and Share. The two policies could be used to help countries fine-tune their responses to climate change and Peak Oil.

Feasta also advocates the introduction of a land-value-based tax, which they believe could be used as a substitute for taxation on labour and could therefore have a similar effect on the market to a carbon tax.

Cap and Share advocates argue that it is impossible to guarantee that emissions reduction targets will be reached by using a purely price-based mechanism for emissions reduction. From their perspective, a definite, substantial decrease in greenhouse gas emissions, carried out in an equitable way so that the poor are not adversely affected, is well worth a possible decrease in aggregate "welfare" as measured by GDP (a highly problematic instrument for measuring wellbeing).

Cap and Share and Renewable Energy 
The policy options that are most likely to impact the electricity sector are economic policies focused on mitigating the threat of climate change. These options could include a cap and share program, carbon tax, or subsidies. Nuclear, solar, wind, and hydroelectric power industries are all likely to become more attractive options if governments implemented economic consequences on utilizing fuel sources that expel carbon dioxide. To support innovation in renewable energy sectors, and nuclear power specifically, the process of development must be economically viable enough for countries to support the adoption of renewable energy for the long term.

See also 

 Cap and dividend
 Carbon tax
 Economics of global warming
 Emissions Reduction Currency System
 Emissions trading
 Georgism
 Greenhouse Development Rights
 Personal carbon trading, an alternative approach to allocating emissions rights directly to individuals
 Pigovian tax

References

External links 
 The Climate Cooperation wiki
 Cap and Share website
 Feasta (The Foundation for the Economics of Sustainability)
 nef (the new economics foundation)
 The Global Commons Institute

Emissions trading
Climate change policy
Irish inventions